In Scandinavian folklore, the mylingar were the phantasmal incarnations of the souls of children that had been forced to roam the earth until they could persuade someone (or otherwise cause enough of a ruckus to make their wishes known) to bury them properly.

Lore 

The myling comes into existence when a child is unwanted and therefore killed by its mother. It can be heard singing in the night, thereby revealing the mother's crime. Ways to help the myling is to give it a name or to find the corpse and bury it in holy soil.

The myling (also known as utburd in Norwegian, útburður in Icelandic and ihtiriekko, liekkiö or sikiö in Finnish) is said to chase lone wanderers at night and jump on their backs, demanding to be carried to the graveyard so they can rest in hallowed ground. Mylings are thought to be enormous and apparently grow heavier as they near the graveyard, to the point where any person carrying one (or more) could sink into the soil. If one should prove unable to make it into the cemetery, the myling kills its victim in a rage.

History 
The word "utburd" means "that which is taken outside" and refers to the practice of abandoning unwanted children (e.g., children born out of wedlock or to parents who lacked the means to care for them) in the woods or in other remote places where death is almost certain to befall them. It is believed that the ghost of the child will then haunt the place where they had died or, as told of in countless stories, the dwellings of their killers.

This infanticide was generally carried out secretly and its victims were often abandoned shortly after birth. From the perspective of certain Christian denominations, the babies were thus denied baptism, acceptance into the Church, and proper burial. As such, they could not rest peacefully.

The belief that mylings are enraged and seeking revenge is what gave them the reputation as one of the most menacing types of ghosts in Scandinavian folklore.

In Popular Culture 
In the mobile game Year Walk, part of the game is spent finding lost Mylings to put in the care of the Brook Horse.

In the subsequent Year Walk: Bedtime Stories for Awful Children, the third chapter is devoted to the Mylings.

See also 
 Bukavac
 Drekavac
 Konaki-jiji (Japanese "Myling")
 Poroniec
 Wiedergänger

References

Sources 

Scandinavian legendary creatures
Scandinavian folklore
Undead